The Jacob Bedenbaugh House is an historic home located near Prosperity, Newberry County, South Carolina.  It was built about 1860, and is a two-story, frame I-house. It was the home of Jacob and Sarah Bedenbaugh, an interracial couple remained together for 42 years during the late-19h and early-20th centuries.

The home is still owned by the descendants of Jacob and Sarah Bedenbaugh.

It was listed on the National Register of Historic Places in 2011.

References 

Houses on the National Register of Historic Places in South Carolina
Houses completed in 1860
Houses in Newberry County, South Carolina
National Register of Historic Places in Newberry County, South Carolina